The present day Pakutuvėnai church was built between 1941–1943 on the initiative of two of the residents of Pakutuvėnai Village, the brother and sister Justina and Juozapas Stropai, and the Plungė parish priest, Prelate Povilas Pukis.

History 
In 1941, the Kretinga district engineer, Jonas Zubkus, prepared the church drawings. The Plungė kommandatura provided 600 bags of cement for the floor of the church, while the Plungė burgomaster, Edvardas Misevičius, following a request from the parish priest, granted 1200 bags of cement left behind by the Russians and 27 iron beams to the church.
The Pakutuvėnai church is laid out in a rectangular shape that is 24 metres long and 12 metres wide. On 26 September 1943, the Telšiai Diocesan Bishop Vincentas Borisevičius solemnly consecrated the church. At first three altars were installed, but only one presently remains. The church has Classical characteristics. At this time, the church is managed by the Franciscan monks.

Gallery

References 

1940s establishments in Lithuania
1943 establishments in Europe
20th-century Roman Catholic church buildings in Lithuania
Roman Catholic churches completed in 1943
Neoclassical church buildings in Lithuania